Qila Mubarak is a fortress of Sikh architecture in Patiala, Punjab, India.

History

Qila Mubarak was first built as a 'Kachigarhi' (Mud fortress) by Sidhu Jat ruler Baba Ala Singh in 1763, who was the founder of the Patiala dynasty. Later, it was reconstructed in baked bricks. It is said that the original fort created in 1763 was an extension built on top of an already existing Mughal fortress built by governor Hussain Khan in Patiala. The interior portion of Qila, which is known as Qila Androon is built by Maharaja Amar Singh.

Quila Mubarak complex
The residential palace of Royal family of Patiala, Qila Mubarak complex is built in  ground in the heart of the city. The whole complex contains Ran Baas (Guest house) and the Darbar Hall (Divan Khana) besides Qila Androon. There is also underground sewerage system in the Qila.

Quila Androon
Qila Androon has 13 royal chambers with scenes from Hindu mythology painted in the Patiala art style.

Museum of Armoury & Chandelier
The Darbar Hall contains rare cannons, swords, shields and maces, daggers of Guru Gobind Singh, and sword of Nadir Shah.

Restoration work
Being a 300-year-old building, the Qila is described as being in 'bad shape' and has been extensively damaged. The fortress is described by the World Monuments Fund as one of world’s 100 "most endangered monuments" in year 2004.

Restoration work of Qila has been undertaken by Indian National Trust for Arts and Cultural Heritage, which has been financially assisted by the state and national governments Archaeological Survey of India. The World Monuments Watch has also funded its preservation.

References

External links
@Wikimapia

Forts in Punjab, India
Sikh architecture
Tourist attractions in Patiala